Ivan Quashigah is a Ghanaian film maker, a creative director and the founder and C.E.O of Farmhouse Productions. He is well known for producing and directing the award-winning television series Things We Do for Love and recently Yolo  .

Early life
Ivan was born in Keta in the south-western part of Ghana on December 28, 1966. He studied film directing and scriptwriting at the National Film and Television Institute (NAFTI) in Ghana. He also has an Executive master's degree in Governance and Leadership from the GIMPA Graduate School in Ghana.

Career
In 2006, Ivan established his production company Farmhouse Productions, a company that works in film, television and events.

Ivan's work in film has won him both local and international awards.

His current TV Series, YOLO – ‘You Only Live Once’ which won seven out of eight awards at the Ghana Movie Awards 2016 is produced for the National Population Council and its partners under the Ghana Adolescent Reproductive Health Programme – GHARP funded by the UKAID and USAID and facilitated by the FHI360 and the Palladium Group.

References

1966 births
Living people
Ghanaian film producers
People from Volta Region